Vernon Longworth (30 August 1877 – 14 February 1963) was a South African cricketer. He played in ten first-class matches for Eastern Province between 1910/11 and 1912/13.

See also
 List of Eastern Province representative cricketers

References

External links
 

1877 births
1963 deaths
South African cricketers
Eastern Province cricketers
Cricketers from Port Elizabeth